Roberto Sanchez Ramírez (born August 17, 1972) is a Mexican former professional baseball pitcher. Known as "Metralleta" (Machine gun in Spanish), he played two seasons in the majors, pitching in 21 games for the San Diego Padres in 1998 and 34 games for the Colorado Rockies in 1999. On August 15, 1999, Ramirez picked up the only save of his career, holding down a 8-2 Rockies victory over the Montreal Expos. He pitched the 8th and 9th innings, striking out two batters and allowing no runs. He saved the win for John Thomson. He joined the Diablos Rojos for the  season.

References

External links

1972 births
Living people
Baseball players at the 2007 Pan American Games
Baseball players from San Luis Potosí
Carolina Mudcats players
Colorado Springs Sky Sox players
Colorado Rockies players
Diablos Rojos del México players
Gulf Coast Pirates players
Hanshin Tigers players
Las Vegas Stars (baseball) players
Major League Baseball pitchers
Major League Baseball players from Mexico
Mexican expatriate baseball players in Japan
Mexican expatriate baseball players in the United States
Mexican League baseball pitchers
Nippon Professional Baseball pitchers
Pan American Games bronze medalists for Mexico
Pan American Games medalists in baseball
San Diego Padres players
Welland Pirates players
2006 World Baseball Classic players
Central American and Caribbean Games bronze medalists for Mexico
Competitors at the 2006 Central American and Caribbean Games
Central American and Caribbean Games medalists in baseball
Medalists at the 2007 Pan American Games